Aurat Foundation, founded in 1986, is a women's rights organization based in Islamabad, Pakistan. Its co-founders were Nigar Ahmed and Shahla Zia. Aurat Foundation lobbies and advocates for women. It also holds demonstrations and public awareness campaigns.

See also 
 Women in Pakistan

References

External links

Women's rights organisations based in Pakistan
Human rights organisations based in Pakistan